Hinkleville is an unincorporated community located in Ballard County, Kentucky, United States.

Originally known as Hinklesville, the community was founded in 1858 as a trading center and was incorporated in March 1868.  The spelling change for the community's name occurred after the American Civil War.  The post office was established in 1869 and closed in 1905, after which the mail went through LaCenter.  The place was likely named for one James Hinkle.

References

Unincorporated communities in Ballard County, Kentucky
Unincorporated communities in Kentucky